{{DISPLAYTITLE:C17H21NO2}}
The molecular formula C17H21NO2 (molar mass: 271.35 g/mol, exact mass: 271.1572 u) may refer to:

 Apoatropine
 Desomorphine
 Nisoxetine

Molecular formulas